Zarkan Rural District is a rural district (dehestan) in Meymeh District, Shahin Shahr and Meymeh County, Isfahan Province, Iran. At the 2006 census, its population was 5,341, in 1,331 families.  The rural district has 6 villages.

References 

Rural Districts of Isfahan Province
Shahin Shahr and Meymeh County